Fridrikh Israilevich Karpelevich (2 October 1927 – 5 July 2000) was a Russian mathematician known for his work on semisimple Lie algebras, geometry, and probability theory. Together with Simon Gindikin, he discovered the Gindikin–Karpelevich formula.

Notes

References

Russian mathematicians
Algebraists
Probability theorists
Queueing theorists